Marine Attack Squadron 133 (VMA-133) was a reserve A-4 Skyhawk fighter squadron in the United States Marine Corps.   Originally known as VMSB-133, the squadron saw combat during the World War II campaigns on Bougainville and Philippines.  Following the war they became part of the Marine Forces Reserve.  The squadron, also known as the “Dragons”, was part of Marine Aircraft Group 42 of the 4th Marine Aircraft Wing and was based out of Naval Air Station Alameda, California.  They were deactivated  in 1992 as part of the post Cold War drawdown of the U.S. Military.

History

World War II
Marine Scout Bombing Squadron 133 (VMSB-133) was activated on May 1, 1943, at Marine Corps Air Station El Toro, California.  After training over the summer they left for Hawaii and arrived at Marine Corps Air Station Ewa on September 9, 1943.  From Ewa, the squadron was split into two sections with one heading to Johnston Atoll and the other to Palmyra Atoll for six months of anti-submarine patrols.  Following these tours they returned to MCAS Ewa only to leave again on June 25, 1944, heading to Torokina on the island of Bougainville.  During October and November 1944 the squadron carried out strikes against targets  on Bougainville and New Britain.

After two months of travelling, VMSB-133 arrived at Lingayen Gulf in the Philippines after the invasion to recapture the area.  They remained there until April 21, 1945, when they moved to Mindanao to provide close air support for the United States Army's 24th and 31st Infantry Regiments as they cleared the island.    Through June and July 1945 they continued to attack targets in the vicinity of Sarangani Bay in preparation for a planned invasion.

The squadron was deactivated on August 1, 1945, at Malabang, Mindanao.

Reserve years
On 15 April 1958 the squadron was reactivated as part of the Marine Air Reserve and was based out of Naval Air Station Oakland, California.  In July 1961 they moved to Naval Air Station Alameda, CA.  In 1962 they gained their final designation of Marine Attack Squadron 133 as they began to transition to the Douglas A-4 Skyhawk. The squadron was a part of Marine Aircraft Group 42 and the 4th Marine Aircraft Wing however they were deactivated on 30 September 1992 as part of the post-Cold War drawdown of the U.S. Military.

Unit awards
A unit citation or commendation is an award bestowed upon an organization for the action cited. Members of the unit who participated in said actions are allowed to wear on their uniforms the awarded unit citation. The VMA-133 has been presented with the following awards:

See also

 United States Marine Corps Aviation
 List of decommissioned United States Marine Corps aircraft squadrons

Notes

References
Bibliography

Web
 VMA-133 Diamondbacks

133
Inactive units of the United States Marine Corps